Thallarcha trissomochla is a moth of the subfamily Arctiinae first described by Turner in 1940. It is found from Townsville in Queensland to northern New South Wales.

References

External links
Australian Faunal Directory

Moths of Australia
Lithosiini
Moths described in 1940